"Better in the Morning" is a song by British singer/songwriter Little Boots. It was released as the lead single from her third studio album, "Working Girl," and enjoyed positive critical reception.

Composition & release
"Better in the Morning" has been described as "sleek pop" and "hip-hop inspired." It samples "Genius of Love" by The Tom Tom Club. The song was released as an audio video on 6 May 2014, to accompany Little Boots' announcement of her new album. A CD single of the song was also made available.

Music video
A music video was released on 4 June 2015 to promote the song. It features Little Boots in front of various pastel-colored backdrops, getting ready for work.

Critical reception
The song received generally positive reviews upon its release. Spin called the song "sunny" and "spectacularly hooky," and noted the song's catchiness. Billboard commented that "Little Boots may have finally found a producer that can magnify her dance-pop sensibilities," going on to praise her coyness but criticize her "deadpan" delivery. Stereogum's Gabriela Tully Claymore felt that the song "rides on the same kind of nostalgic computer-pop production technique that’s propelled PC Music to the forefront over the course of the past year, minus the irony."

References

External links
 Official Music Video at YouTube

Little Boots songs
2014 singles
2014 songs
Songs written by Little Boots
Songs written by Ariel Rechtshaid